Antonio Juliano (born 1 January 1943) is a former Italian footballer who played as a midfielder. A creative playmaker, he was renowned in particular for his leadership, technical ability, and ball control, as well as for his vision, stamina, and passing range.

Club career
 
Juliano played the majority of his club career with Napoli (1962–78), winning the Coppa delle Alpi in 1966, and the Coppa Italia and the Anglo-Italian League Cup in 1976. He finished his playing career after a season with Bologna, retiring in 1979, after helping the club to avoid relegation.

International career
Juliano earned 18 caps for the Italy national football team between 1966 and 1974, and was a member of the championship-winning team of Euro 68. He was also in the Italian squad for three World Cup finals: 1966 (wearing the number 10 shirt), 1970 and 1974. However, he played only one World Cup match, the 4–1 defeat by Brazil in the 1970 final, after coming on as a substitute.

After retirement
After retiring, he returned to Napoli as a sporting director, a role in which he oversaw the acquisitions of Ruud Krol in 1980, and of Diego Maradona, from Barcelona, in 1984.

Honours

Club
Napoli
Coppa Italia (1): 1975–76
Anglo-Italian League Cup (1): 1976
Coppa delle Alpi (1): 1966

International
Italy
 UEFA European Championship (1): 1968
 FIFA World Cup Runner-up: 1970

References

1943 births
Living people
Italian footballers
Italy international footballers
1966 FIFA World Cup players
UEFA Euro 1968 players
1970 FIFA World Cup players
1974 FIFA World Cup players
UEFA European Championship-winning players
S.S.C. Napoli players
Bologna F.C. 1909 players
Serie A players
Serie B players
Footballers from Naples
Footballers from Campania
Association football midfielders